Geula Nuni (9 June 1942 – 10 November 2014) was an Israeli actress and singer.

Biography
Nuni was born in Ramat Gan in a family of three daughters to a Yemeni-Jewish father and an Austrian-Jewish mother. She made her first stage appearance at the age of 15 and she first appeared in the 1960 film I Like Mike. In 1961, she served in the Nahal Troupe and after leaving, she left for Europe where she studied the works of Mary Wigman. Upon returning to Israel, Nuni worked in the Habima Theatre and appeared in the stage adaptation of Irma La Douce which boosted her popularity.

Nuni's most famous film appearance was in the 1964 film Sallah Shabati starring Chaim Topol. She performed a song on the film with her on-screen partner Arik Einstein. Nuni's other films have included Charlie and a Half and A Thousand and One Wives. In 1971, Nuni moved to Vienna and pursued various projects and starred in a stage production about the Dreyfus affair.

Upon Nuni's return to Israel, she acted in a short lived 1994 sitcom with Ze'ev Revach and acted in various television shows until 2010. Nuni also had a career as a voice actress. Her most notable voice dubbing role was when she performed the Hebrew voice of Fanny in Casper Meets Wendy. She retired in 2011.

Personal life
Nuni married twice. Her second husband was the mime artist Samy Molcho. She also had one daughter, Sharon and three grandchildren.

Death
Nuni died of cancer at Ichilov Hospital on 10 November 2014, at the age of 72. She was interred at Nahalat Yitzhak Cemetery.

References

External links

1942 births
2014 deaths

Burials at Nahalat Yitzhak Cemetery
Deaths from cancer in Israel
Israeli expatriates in Austria
Israeli film actresses
Israeli people of Austrian-Jewish descent
Israeli people of Yemeni-Jewish descent
Israeli stage actresses
Israeli television actresses
Israeli voice actresses
Jewish Israeli actresses
People from Ramat Gan
20th-century Israeli actresses
21st-century Israeli actresses
20th-century Israeli women singers